Baron Aldington, of Bispham in the County Borough of Blackpool, is a title in the Peerage of the United Kingdom. It was created on 29 January 1962 for the Conservative politician and businessman, Sir Toby Low. On 16 November 1999 he was made a life peer as Baron Low, of Bispham in the County of Lancashire, as were all hereditary peers of the first creation following the House of Lords Act 1999. On his death in 2000 the life peerage became extinct while he was succeeded in the hereditary barony by his son Charles, the second and  present holder of the title.

Lord Aldington was controversially accused of sending 70,000 cossacks and their families who had surrendered to the British forces in Austria after the Second World War over the border to the Soviets. This highly secret act contravened the Geneva Convention as they were not citizens of the USSR, and it was obvious that they would be massacred or sent to GULAGs. Aldington's superior was Harold Macmillan, the future prime minister, who has been accused of being an agent for Stalin. The historian Nikolai Tolstoy said as much in print and was sued by Aldington in 1989 for defamation. In a highly controversial court case, Aldington won and Tolstoy was asked to pay £1.5m in damages and £0.5m for Aldington's legal fees.

Barons Aldington (1962)
Toby Austin Richard William Low, 1st Baron Aldington, Baron Low (1914–2000)
Charles Harold Stuart Low, 2nd Baron Aldington (b. 1948)

The heir apparent and sole heir to the peerage is the present holder's son, Philip Toby Augustus Low (b. 1990)

Arms

References

Baronies in the Peerage of the United Kingdom
Noble titles created in 1962
Noble titles created for UK MPs